Laith Subhi Drzi Al-Bashtawi is a Jordanian footballer who plays for Al-Jalil.

International goals

With U-16

With U-19

With U-23

References

External links

Profile at hesport.com 
Profile at Goal.com

1994 births
Living people
Jordanian footballers
Jordan international footballers
Jordan youth international footballers
Association football forwards
Jordanian Pro League players
Al-Wehdat SC players
Shabab Al-Ordon Club players
Al-Ahli SC (Amman) players
Al-Hussein SC (Irbid) players
Al-Jalil players
Sportspeople from Amman
Footballers at the 2014 Asian Games
Asian Games competitors for Jordan